Yangwei Linghua (born 20 December 1980) is a Chinese singer. She sings in Mandarin Chinese and Mongolian, and she is a member of the Chinese popular music duo Phoenix Legend. Her partner is Zeng Yi.

Biography
Yangwei Linghua was born on 20 December 1980 in Ordos, Inner Mongolia. She is ethnically Mongolian. In her early years, she worked in Guangzhou as a saleswoman after high school. In 2011, she joined the CPC Central Military Commission Political Department Song and Dance Troupe.

Personal life
Yang's husband is Xu Mingzhao, a businessman, entrepreneur, and the CEO of Bairen Entertainment. In March 2011, they married in Erdos.

References

1980 births
Living people
Chinese Mandopop singers
People from Ordos City
Singers from Inner Mongolia
21st-century Chinese women singers
Chinese people of Mongolian descent